Pioneer Point is an unincorporated community in the Searles Valley of the Mojave Desert, in northern San Bernardino County, California.

Searles Valley census-designated place
Pioneer Point and the communities of Argus, Trona, and Searles Valley (community) make up the Searles Valley census-designated place.

See also

References

Unincorporated communities in San Bernardino County, California
Populated places in the Mojave Desert
Searles Valley
Unincorporated communities in California